Nirmala Balwant Purandare (née Mazgaonkar; January 5, 1933, in Baroda – July 20, 2019, in Pune) was an Indian social activist whose work focused on the education of children and advancement of women from rural Pune. She authored the book Snehayatra. She was the wife of playwright Babasaheb Purandare. She was the recipient of the Punyabhushan in 2012.

References 

1933 births
2019 deaths
Indian activists
People from Vadodara